Giovanni Battista Tinti (1558-1617) was an Italian painter of the Renaissance period. He studied first under Orazio Samacchini in Bologna, and subsequently established himself in Parma, where he was inspired chiefly by the work of Tibaldi, Correggio and Parmigianino. He painted an Assumption for the cathedral of Parma and the cupola frescoes for the church of Santa Maria degli Angeli in Parma.

References

External links

1558 births
1617 deaths
16th-century Italian painters
Italian male painters
17th-century Italian painters
Painters from Bologna
Painters from Parma
Italian Renaissance painters